Garyn Phillips is a Welsh rugby union player, currently playing for Pro14 side Ospreys. His preferred position is prop.

Ospreys
Phillips was named in the Ospreys academy for the 2020–21 season, having previously been a member of the Cardiff Blues academy. He made his Ospreys debut in Round 12 of the 2020–21 Pro14 in the match against , coming on as a replacement.

References

External links
Garyn Phillips Statistics

Living people
Welsh rugby union players
Ospreys (rugby union) players
Rugby union props
2001 births
Cornish Pirates players